E21 may refer to:
 BMW E21, an automobile platform
 HMS E21
 European route E21
 DRG series E 21, different locomotives of the German National Railroad
 E21 - Code that it designates the Astronomical observatory of Norm Roses, Leyburn
 E21 - code ECHO of the Nimzo-Indian Defence, opening of chess 
 Eyeshield 21, a manga based on American Football
 Economics21, or e21, web portal of the Manhattan Institute for Policy Research
 Kajang–Seremban Highway, route E21 in Malaysia